"Na Na Na Na" is the first single from 112's 2003 album, Hot & Wet. Q and Slim share lead vocals and the song features Dancehall legend Super Cat.

Track listing 
"Na Na Na Na" — 4:48
"To The Crib" — 3:52

Charts

Weekly charts

References 

2003 singles
112 (band) songs
Bad Boy Records singles
2003 songs
Songs written by Daron Jones
Songs written by Quinnes Parker
Songs written by Slim (singer)